Mauro Alexandre de Silva Almeida (born 29 January 1982) is a Portuguese footballer.

He started his career with top Portuguese side FC Porto, where he failed to make a first team appearance, before moving to Estrela Amadora where he stayed for two seasons. He then left to join Dutch side FC Zwolle in January 2004, where he played for a year before leaving to play for Bulgarian top division club Vihren Sandanski. He was released, but was spotted by Accrington Stanley shortly after, during a mid-season training trip to Spain. He left Stanley at the end of the season.

He signed for Swindon Town at the end of August 2007, and made his debut against Brentford in the JP Trophy on 4 September. On 27 February 2008, Sligo Rovers announced the signing of Almeida after a short trial with the club.
 
He left in June 2009 after a career-threatening injury.  On 24 February 2010, Sligo Rovers announced the signing of Almeida after a short trial with the club.

External links

1982 births
Living people
People from Viseu
Portuguese footballers
Accrington Stanley F.C. players
Eerste Divisie players
C.F. Estrela da Amadora players
OFC Vihren Sandanski players
C.R.D. Libolo players
G.D. Sagrada Esperança players
Progresso da Lunda Sul players
Sligo Rovers F.C. players
Swindon Town F.C. players
Expatriate footballers in Angola
Expatriate footballers in Bulgaria
Expatriate footballers in England
Expatriate footballers in the Netherlands
Expatriate association footballers in the Republic of Ireland
FC Porto players
PEC Zwolle players
Association football defenders
Girabola players
League of Ireland players
Portuguese expatriate footballers
Portuguese expatriate sportspeople in Bulgaria
Portuguese expatriate sportspeople in Ireland
Portuguese expatriate sportspeople in the Netherlands
First Professional Football League (Bulgaria) players
Sportspeople from Viseu District